The Battle of Fort Dipitie was fought in October 1915 during the United States occupation of Haiti. U.S. Marines and rebel Haitians — known as "Cacos" — fought at the Grande Riviere which resulted in the destruction of Fort Dipitie, an outpost of Fort Capois.

Battle
On 24 October 1915, Marine Major Smedley Butler was in command of a mounted reconnaissance patrol south of Fort Liberte, Haiti, near the enemy-held Fort Dipitie.  While fording the Grande at night, a force of more than 400 rifle-armed Cacos attacked the Marines from three different positions.  The Americans were shocked and returned a few shots before retreating to high ground a few hundred yards to their rear.  During the retreat, the Marines lost their only machine gun when a Caco rifleman shot the horse carrying it.

The Cacos followed up their ambush and attacked the Marines again.  All night long, the Americans held their ground.  (Cacos were reputed to be poor marksmen and, indeed, only one Marine was wounded in the battle; altogether, about 75 Haitians were killed in the two-day battle.)  Later that night, Boxer Rebellion veteran and Medal of Honor recipient Daniel Daly retrieved the machine gun and killed three Haitians with his knife, earning himself his second Medal of Honor.  (First Lieutenant Edward Albert Ostermann commanded one of the squads; he, too, was awarded the Medal of Honor for heroic action in this engagement.)

Major Butler planned to counter-attack at first light on October 25. He told his men to charge as fast as they could and shoot everything around.  The Marines divided into three groups and ran toward the river and the main body of the enemy.  When they were sighted, the Cacos fled the field, into their fort; several did not escape and were killed by American fire.  The Marines captured Fort Dipitie from the remaining Cacos and held it.  Major Butler and his men returned to base at Cap-Haïtien a few days later, and in November went on to fight in the Battle of Fort Rivière, the engagement which ended the First Caco War.

See also
Banana Wars
Fort Riviere

References

Bibliography

Langley, Lester D. (1985). The Banana Wars: United States Intervention in the Caribbean, 1898–1934 Lexington: University Press of Kentucky 

Republic of Haiti (1859–1957)
Fort Dipitie
October 1915 events
1915 in Haiti
Conflicts in 1915